Chiodo is a surname. Notable people with the surname include:

Agostino Chiodo (1791–1861), Italian politician and prime minister of the Kingdom of Sardinia 
Andy Chiodo (born 1983), Canadian ice hockey goaltender
Diego Chiodo (born 1970), Argentinian hockey player
Frank Chiodo, Iowa state representative
Joe Chiodo, American comics colorist
Ned F. Chiodo (born 1942), American politician in the state of Iowa
Peter Chiodo (born 1940), American, mafia captain turned witness
The Chiodo Brothers, filmmakers famous for Killer Klowns from Outer Space

See also
Chiodos, band named after the brothers who produced an album also referencing them:
The Chiodos Brothers. (acoustic)